Don Ross is the title of a recording by Canadian guitarist Don Ross, released in 1990.

Track listing

 "Groovy Sunflowers"
 "Zarzuela"
 "Thin Air"
 "Bluefinger"
 "Carolan's Quarrel with the Landlady, Michael and Juliana"
 "Lucy Watusi"
 "Wall of Glass"
 "Enka"
 "August on the Island"
 "Little Giants"

Personnel
Don Ross – guitar

Instructional Videos

 August on the Island

Don Ross (guitarist) albums
1990 albums
Duke Street Records albums